The Hennessey Venom F5 is a sports car developed and manufactured by the American vehicle-manufacturing company Hennessey Special Vehicles which was established in 2017. Hennessey has contracted with Delta Motorsport of Silverstone, England for the development of the vehicle, which will be the company's first all new proprietary vehicle as an accredited titled manufacturer.  Delta Motorsport also produced all of the previous generation Venom GT cars for Hennessey at its facility in England.

Initial release 
The Hennessey Venom F5 was first revealed in August 2014. Subsequently, it was shown as an exterior mock-up at the American SEMA Show in Las Vegas on November 1, 2017. This did not contain an engine or an interior.

Specifications

Initial reports had the Venom F5 powered by a completely bespoke and proprietary 7.4 L twin-turbocharged V8 engine; later it was revealed that while being still in development, the engine is to have an even larger capacity of 8.0 liters but the final displacement of the engine was revealed to be 6.6 liters. The Venom F5 will have a bespoke iron block engine. The top speed is claimed to be  through a V-MAX speed-tracking system.

The available transmission is a CIMA 7-speed single-clutch automated manual transmission with paddle-shifters, driving the rear wheels, making the car rear-wheel drive.

The chassis and body will be made almost entirely of carbon fiber. Active aerodynamics are now paired with the body, a first for Hennessey. Because of the use of active aerodynamics and a sleek, new design it has an estimated . For the production F5, this was increased to a claimed .

Hennessey has also placed great emphasis on interior space, quality and comfort, and that despite offering extreme performance the vehicle still will offer a spacious and comfortable interior experience that can accommodate tall and large drivers and passengers. It was mentioned that an undisclosed NFL player, who has only been described as being 6'7" tall, has placed an order for one of the first models once full production has commenced.

Each Venom F5 comes with the "Treasure Chest", a giant aluminum box containing the key fob, a magnetic trickle charger, and a tow hook. The key fob's serial number plate is made from a metal component that was disposed from a Space Shuttle launch. Company founder John Hennessey was given the component by an astronaut and broke it into pieces to give Venom F5 owners "a piece of space".

Production 
Production will be limited to 24 units, 12 of which were already sold by December 2020. Eight cars are planned to be built and delivered in 2021. In August 2021 the company officially announced that it had customer orders for and sold all planned 24 units of the F5.

See also 
 List of production cars by power output

References 

Sports cars
Cars introduced in 2020

External links

Hennessey Special Vehicles

Rear mid-engine, rear-wheel-drive vehicles
Hennessey vehicles